RAF Narborough was a military aerodrome in Norfolk operated in the First World War. It opened on 28 May 1915, originally as a Royal Naval Air Station for RNAS Great Yarmouth tasked with defending against Zeppelin raids. The airfield covered a  site, including  of buildings - making it the largest First World War airfield in Britain. These buildings included seven large hangars, seven  sheds, five workshops, two coal yards, two Sergeant's Messes, three Dope sheds and a Guardroom.

Unit history
The airfield was transferred to the Royal Flying Corps in 1916, with the arrival of No. 35 Squadron of 7 Wing from Snarehill, operating Vickers F.B.5, Royal Aircraft Factory B.E.2c and BE2e and Armstrong Whitworth FK3 aircraft.  Initially the squadron trained as a Corps Reconnaissance unit, until moving to France on 25 January 1917 equipped with the Armstrong Whitworth FK8.

No. 59 Squadron was formed at Narborough on 1 August 1916, also as a Corps Reconnaissance unit, operating RE8s and possibly DH2s. This squadron moved to France on 13 February 1917.

Several other units operated from this airfield, including No. 48 Reserve, No. 50 Reserve, No. 53 Reserve Squadrons and No. 1 Training Squadron, who operated the Sopwith Camel from Narborough between 1 October 1917 and 10 October 1917. No. 83 Squadron of 7 Wing arrived from Wyton in December 1917 for training in the night bomber role. On 1 January 1918, No. 121 Squadron was formed here with Airco DH9 light bombers.

Armistice celebration

On 11 November 1918, aircraft from nearby RAF Marham bombed Narborough with flour bags to celebrate the Armistice. RAF Narborough retaliated against Marham, sending its planes to bomb them with bags of soot.

Closure

No. 56, 60 and 64 Squadrons of 38 Wing arrived in February 1919, from the Western Front, but brought no aircraft. No. 64 Squadron disbanded on 31 December 1919, while No. 56 and 60 Squadrons left for RAF Bircham Newton, with the station closing down and being returned to agriculture.
Almost nothing remains of this airfield today, with the last hangar being demolished in mid 1977, having been damaged by gales.

RAF units and aircraft

See also
Royal Air Force station
List of former Royal Air Force stations
List of Royal Air Force aircraft squadrons

Notes

References

External links
 http://www.narborough.org.uk/ Narborough Aerodrome

Military units and formations established in 1915
Royal Air Force stations in Norfolk
Royal Air Force stations of World War II in the United Kingdom
Royal Flying Corps airfields